Squamella is a genus of lichenized fungi in the family Cladoniaceae. The genus is  monotypic, containing the single species Squamella spumosa, which is found in Australia. Both the genus and species were described by Samuel Hammer in 2001.

References

Cladoniaceae
Lichen genera
Monotypic Lecanorales genera
Taxa described in 2001